Thomas Warburton (4 March 1918 in Vaasa – 18 December 2016 in Helsinki) was a Finnish writer, translator, and recipient of the Eino Leino Prize in 1997.

Warburton translated James Joyce's Ulysses into Swedish in 1946 and his revised translation was published in 1993.

References

1918 births
2016 deaths
People from Vaasa
Finnish people of English descent
Finnish writers in Swedish
Writers from Ostrobothnia (region)
Recipients of the Eino Leino Prize
Translators to Swedish
Finnish critics
20th-century translators